The 54th Kentucky Mounted Infantry Regiment was a mounted infantry regiment that served in the Union Army during the American Civil War.

Service
The 54th Kentucky Mounted Infantry Regiment was organized at New Castle, Kentucky and mustered in September 1864 under the command of Colonel Harvey M. Buckley.

The regiment was attached to Military District of Kentucky and Department of Kentucky, to September 1865.

The 54th Kentucky Mounted Infantry mustered out of service at Louisville, Kentucky on September 1, 1865.

Detailed service
Operating against guerrillas in Henry County, Kentucky, until December 1864. Stoneman's Raid into southwest Virginia December 10–29. Near Marion, Virginia, December 17–18. Saltville, Virginia, December 20–21. Capture and destruction of salt works. Provost duty in country about Lexington, Kentucky, and operating against guerrillas until September 1865.

Casualties
The regiment lost a total of 30 men during service; 1 enlisted man killed, 29 enlisted men died of disease.

Commanders
 Colonel Harvey M. Buckley

See also

 List of Kentucky Civil War Units
 Kentucky in the Civil War

References
 Dyer, Frederick H.  A Compendium of the War of the Rebellion (Des Moines, IA:  Dyer Pub. Co.), 1908.
Attribution
 

Military units and formations established in 1864
Military units and formations disestablished in 1865
Units and formations of the Union Army from Kentucky
1864 establishments in Kentucky